Iwerne Courtney, also known as Shroton, is a village and civil parish in the English county of Dorset. It is sited by the small River Iwerne between Hambledon Hill to the south-west and the hills of Cranborne Chase to the east. In 2001 the parish had 187 households and a population of 400. In 2013 the estimated population of the parish was 410.

Toponymy
The names Iwerne Courtney and Shroton both have long histories. Iwerne is a Celtic rivername that perhaps refers to a goddess or may mean "yew-river". The village was recorded as Ywern in 877 AD, and in 1086 in the Domesday Book it was Werne. The addition of Courtney is a result of land by the Iwerne stream being owned in the 13th century by the Courtenay family, the Earls of Devon.

The name Shroton derives from the Old English scīr-rēfa and tūn, meaning "sheriff's estate" or "sheriff's town", and its use is due to the lord and tenant-in-chief at the time of Domesday being Baldwin of Exeter, the sheriff of Devon. In 1403 the name was recorded as Shyrevton.

The name Shroton is preferred locally; in his 1980 book Dorset Villages, Roland Gant stated that "I have heard only visitors to Dorset call it Iwerne Courtney".

History
At the time of the Domesday Book, Iwerne Courtney had 17 households and was in the hundred of Gillingham. It had 2 mills,  of meadow, 8 ploughlands, and its value to the lord of the manor was £10.

In 1261 the village received a grant from Henry the Third, enabling it to hold two annual fairs and a weekly market. The autumn "Shroton Fair" used to be "one of the main Dorset events of the year". It is mentioned in Owen's book of fairs (1788), under the name Shroton. In 1965 Dorset-born broadcaster Ralph Wightman wrote of the fair that "For many years time was dated in this part of Dorset by Shroton Fair. Old men recalled events by the number of months they had happened before or after this event." However the fair has now "vanished without a trace".

The civil parish of the village was formed by the joining of three settlements: Iwerne Courtney in the centre, Farrington to the northwest and Ranston immediately east of the river. Each settlement had its own open field system. Farrington now consists of a few farms, and at Ranston only the manor house remains.

Governance
The parish of Iwerne Courtney or Shroton is within the Dorset Council ward of Beacon and the parliamentary constituency of North Dorset.  The MP since 2015 is Simon Hoare of the Conservative Party.

Geography

References

External links 

Villages in Dorset
Civil parishes in Dorset